Water & Bridges is the twenty-sixth studio album by American country music singer Kenny Rogers. It was released on March 21, 2006 via Capitol Records Nashville. The album accounted for three singles: "I Can't Unlove You," "The Last Ten Years (Superman)" and "Calling Me," all of which charted on Hot Country Songs. These songs respectively reached peaks of 17, 56 and 53.

Thom Jurek of Allmusic rated the album three stars out of five, saying that it "isn't a perfect record, but it's a sincere one."

"Someone Somewhere Tonight" was later covered by Pam Tillis and Kellie Pickler, the latter of which release the song as a single to country radio in May 2013. "Half a Man" was originally recorded by Anthony Smith on his album If That Ain't Country, and his version charted at number 40 on Hot Country Songs in 2003. The title track was originally recorded by Collin Raye on his 2000 album Tracks, which was also produced by Dann Huff.

Track listing

Personnel 

 Kenny Rogers – lead vocals
 John Barlow Jarvis – acoustic piano (1-6, 8-11)
 Charlie Judge – keyboards (2, 4, 5, 8), synthesizers (7)
 Jim Hoke – accordion (5)
 Warren Hartman – synthesizers (7)
 Gordon Mote – acoustic piano (7)
 Tom Bukovac – electric guitar (1, 3, 5, 6, 8-11)
 Dann Huff – electric guitar
 Bryan Sutton – acoustic guitar (1, 3, 5, 6, 9, 10, 11)
 Kenny Greenberg – electric guitar (2, 7)
 Biff Watson – acoustic guitar (2, 4, 7, 8)
 Jonathan Yudkin – mandolin (2), bouzouki (4), fiddle (4, 8), cello (7), viola (7), violin (7), string arrangements and composing (7)
 Russ Pahl – steel guitar (1-10)
 Bruce Bouton – dobro (8), steel guitar (11)
 Michael Rhodes – bass guitar (1, 3, 5, 6, 9, 10, 11)
 Mike Brignardello – bass guitar (2, 4, 7, 8)
 Matt Chamberlain – drums (1, 3, 5, 6, 9, 10, 11)
 Shannon Forrest – drums (2, 4, 7, 8)
 Eric Darken – percussion (1, 3, 5, 6, 9, 10, 11)
 Paul Buckmaster – string arrangements and conductor (1, 11)
 The London Session Orchestra – strings (1, 11)
 Perry Coleman – backing vocals (1, 2, 4–8, 10, 11)
 Russell Terrell – backing vocals (2, 4, 6, 8, 10)
 Sarah Buxton – backing vocals (3)
 Don Henley – lead vocals (5)
 Vince Gill – backing vocals (9)

Production 
 Producer – Dann Huff
 Production Coordination – Mike "Frog" Griffith
 A&R Coordination – Darrell Griffith
 Recorded by Jeff Balding, Jed Hackett, Mark Hagen and Justin Niebank.
 Assistant Recording by Drew Bollman, Steve Crowder, Travis Daniels, Allen Ditto, Greg Lawrence and David Robinson.
 Recorded at Blackbird Studios, Emerald Entertainment and Cartee Day Studios (Nashville, TN); Tree Sound Studios (Atlanta, GA).
 Strings on Tracks 1 & 11 recorded by Steve Churchyard at Capitol Studios (Hollywood, CA), assisted by Aaron Walk.
 Don Henley's vocal recorded by Mark Hagen at Patchwerk Recording Studio (Atlanta, GA).
 Digital Editing – Chris Rowe
 ProTools Engineer – Andy Ackland
 Mixed by Justin Niebank at The Sound Kitchen (Franklin, TN); assisted by Drew Bollman and Melissa Mattey.
 Mastered by Adam Ayan at Gateway Mastering (Portland, ME).
 Art Direction – Joanna Carter
 Design – Joe Rogers
 Art Production – Denise Arguijo and Michelle Hall
 Digital Imaging – Colourworks
 Photography – Melanie Dunea

Charts

Weekly charts

Year-end charts

References

2006 albums
Capitol Records albums
Albums arranged by Paul Buckmaster
Albums produced by Dann Huff
Kenny Rogers albums